Kahak is a village in Howmeh Rural District, in the Central District of Garmsar County, Semnan Province, Iran. At the 2006 census, its population was 26, in 7 families.

References 

Populated places in Garmsar County